L'imbranato (The bumbling man) is a 1979 Italian comedy film written and directed by Pier Francesco Pingitore.

Plot   
Pippo Sperandio is an employee of an Italian electronics company in direct contact with his boss, the pleasure-seeker Dr. Maramotti, who never misses an opportunity to have relationships with different types of women including Laura, his secretary. However, when he needs to be replaced during a holiday in Sardinia he calls and sends Pippo Sperandio to his place who - as Doctor Maramotti - will have to deal with a hectic holiday full of sport and goliardic parties, typical of the tourist villages of those years, which he is not used to.

Cast 
 Pippo Franco: Pippo Sperandio
 Laura Troschel: Laura 
 Bombolo: Bombolo Cicerchia 
 Luciana Turina: Poldina Sperandio 
 Duilio Del Prete: Dr. Felice Maramotti
 Oreste Lionello: "Man-i-drake"
 Enzo Cannavale: The man who laughs
 Teo Teocoli: Teo
 Sergio Leonardi: Bandit
 Giancarlo Magalli: Capo animatore
 Franca Scagnetti: Doorwoman

See also    
 List of Italian films of 1979

References

External links

1979 films
Italian comedy films
1979 comedy films
Films directed by Pier Francesco Pingitore
Films scored by Alessandro Alessandroni
1970s Italian films